Integral Coach Factory (ICF) is a manufacturer of rail coaches located in Perambur, Chennai, Tamil Nadu, India. It was established in 1955 and is owned and operated by the Indian Railways. It is located in Perambur, in the suburbs of Chennai. The ICF is one of the five rake production units of the Indian Railways, the other four  being the Modern Coach Factory at Raebareli, Rail Coach Factory at Kapurthala , Marathwada Rail Coach Factory at Latur and Rail coach factory at sonipat .

The coach factory primarily manufactures rolling stock for Indian Railways but also exports railway coaches to other countries. ICF set a new record producing 2,503 coaches in the fiscal year 2017–18. It became the world's largest railway coach manufacturer, rolling out 3,262 coaches in the fiscal year 2018–19, up from 1,437 coaches in 2009–10, expecting to produce 4,000 units in the fiscal year 2019–20.

A premier production unit of the Indian railways, the ICF manufactures a range of coaches, including Linke-Hofmann-Busch (LHB) ones, in addition to self-propelled train sets (SPTs) such as electrical multiple units (EMU).

Introduction

In 1948, the Government of India decided that a separate Railway Coach Building Works should be established with a view to attain self-sufficiency in coaches for Indian Railways. A technical Aid Agreement was concluded on 28 May 1949 with the Swiss Car and Elevator Manufacturing Corporation Ltd. of Switzerland, who have been pioneers in the field of light-weight coach building for obtaining the necessary technical assistance in the establishment of a factory in India for building the coaches. A supplemental agreement was signed on 27 June 1953. After a comprehensive survey of several alternative sites for locating the factory, the vacant Railway land to the west of the Loco Repair Shops of the Southern Railway at Perambur was chosen as the final site in June 1951. The site is ideally situated with rail connections to the factory readily available and a nearby suburban railway station to bring workmen to the factory.

History

The Integral Coach Factory is one of the earliest production units of independent India. It was initiated by Chief Minister K. Kamaraj and inaugurated by the first Prime Minister of India Jawaharlal Nehru on 2 October 1955. Later the Furnishing Division was inaugurated on 2 October 1962 and the production of fully furnished coaches steadily increased over the years. The total estimated cost of the factory was  74.7 million. In full production, about 350 broad-gauge coaches per annum are produced.  The number of persons sent to Switzerland from the Integral Coach Factory for training in technical jobs in 1954 and 1955 was 64.

Manufacturing

The ICF consists of two main divisions, namely, shell division and furnishing division. The shell division manufactures the skeleton of the rail coach, while the furnishing division is concerned with the coach interiors and amenities. An ancillary unit to the ICF is being built in Haldia, West Bengal for furnishing diesel multiple units. ICF manufactures more than 170 varieties of coaches including the Kolkata Metro rakes for BHEL, NGEF, Medha, first and second class coaches, pantry and kitchen cars, luggage and brake vans, self-propelled coaches, electric (EMU), diesel (DMU) and mainline electric multiple unit (MEMU), metro coaches and diesel-electric tower cars, accident relief medical vans (ARMV), inspection cars (RA), fuel test cars, track recording cars and luxury coaches. The plant employs about 11,095 people and manufactures about 2000 coaches per year. ICF churned out 1,503 coaches in 2010 and in August 2011, ICF was sanctioned a project for manufacturing stainless steel shells and high-speed bogies and an increase in capacity from 1,500 to 1,700 coaches. In 2013–14, it built 25 LHB coach, 248 air-conditioned and 1185 non-AC coaches. It plans to increase its manufacturing capacity of LHB coach. It has set a target to manufacture 300 LHB coach in 2014–15 and reach a capacity of 1000 LHB coach by 2016–17. Now, the conventional type of coaches of ICF design has been completely dispensed with and ICF is manufacturing all steel all welded modern LHB coach fully. ICF has turned out a record outturn of 2277 coaches during the year 2016–17 consisting of more than 50 variants involving high technological inputs, meticulous planning and execution. In 2019, ICF produced 4300 coaches. A total of 60,000 coaches had been produced till end of December 2019, by ICF since its inception. This makes ICF the largest rail coach manufacturer in the world. On an average, the ICF turns out about 10 coaches of various types in a single day.

ICF has also turned out the first semi high speed train sets of India, the Train 18, later christened as Vande Bharat Express, the first of which was flagged off by the Prime Minister of India on 15 February 2019 runs between New Delhi Railway Station and Varanasi Junction Railway Station. ICF has till date manufactured a total of 10 Vande Bharat train sets which operate between different cities of India:

The following table provides the list of trains in service as of February 2023

Exports
ICF also exports rail cars to various countries. It exported its first 47 bogies to Thailand in 1967 and has since exported 361 bogies and 447 coaches to over 13 Afro-Asian countries. The last order from Sri Lanka for supplying 20 rakes of six coach DEMUs earned ICF ₹126 crore.

Other
A Regional Railway Museum is situated in the factory premises. It has a collection of nascent models of trains and models endemic to the Indian Railways. About 59.1 million units of electricity had been generated through the windmills installed by ICF in Tirunelveli district in 2011 which met 80 percent of the plant's electrical energy requirements.

Controversies
The air-conditioned train-sets manufactured by ICF for Kolkata Metro allegedly broke down causing disruption of services. According to newspaper reports, the air-conditioned rakes were sent to Kolkata without conducting dry runs because the ICF did not have third rail testing facilities.

See also 

 Diesel Locomotive Factory, Marhowrah
 Electric Locomotive Factory, Madhepura
 Chittaranjan Locomotive Works, Asansol
 Banaras Locomotive Works, Varanasi
 Modern Coach Factory, Raebareli
 Rail Coach Factory, Kapurthala
 Rail Wheel Plant, Bela
 Rail Wheel Factory, Yelahanka
 Titagarh Wagons, Titagarh
 List of locomotive builders by countries

References

Further reading

External links
 
 Conventional ICF coach vs LHB coach and list of trains using LHB coach

Companies based in Chennai
Economy of Chennai
Coach and wagon manufacturers of India
1955 establishments in Madras State
Industrial buildings completed in 1955